Seykhan Famalovych Aliyev (born 22 September 1991) is a Ukrainian footballer who plays as a midfielder.

Aliyev was a product of the FC Avanhard Yevpatoria academy. In 2010, he signed a contract with FC Stal Dniprodzerzhynsk in the Ukrainian Second League, and made his debut in the Second League against FC Hirnyk Kryvyi Rih on 19 March 2010.

References

External links
 

1991 births
Living people
Ukrainian footballers
People from Sovetskyi Raion
Association football midfielders
FC Stal Kamianske players
FC Yevpatoriya players
Ukrainian First League players
Ukrainian Second League players
Crimean Premier League players